The Orlando Open was a golf tournament on the PGA Tour from 1945 to 1947. It was played at Dubsdread Country Club in Orlando, Florida. The 1947 event went to a playoff after Jimmy Demaret, Dave Douglas and Herman Keiser were tied on 274 after the 72 holes. There was an 18-hole playoff the following day. Douglas and Demaret were again tied on 71 with Keiser taking 73. There was then a sudden-death playoff with Douglas winning with a birdie 3 at the first extra hole.

Winners

References

Former PGA Tour events
Golf in Florida